Vernon Gordon Fuller (born March 1, 1944 in Menomonie, Wisconsin) is a retired American professional baseball player. The second baseman and third baseman appeared in 325 Major League games over six seasons for the Cleveland Indians in 1964 and from 1966–1970.

Fuller graduated from Canoga Park High School in Southern California and attended what is now California State University, Northridge and Arizona State University.  Signing with Cleveland in 1963, he split his first pro season between Class A and Double-A in the Indians' farm system.  He then spent the entire  season on Cleveland's MLB roster, although he was on the disabled list until early September.  In his big-league debut, as a pinch hitter September 5, he grounded out to Joel Horlen of the Chicago White Sox.

Fuller returned to the minor leagues for most of 1965–1966. But he never batted higher than .242 and in  he lost his regular job to Eddie Leon. It was his final season in professional baseball.

As a Major Leaguer, Fuller collected 182 hits, including 33 doubles, four triples and 14 home runs.

References

External links

1944 births
Living people
Baseball players from Los Angeles
Baseball players from Wisconsin
Cal State Northridge Matadors baseball players
Charleston Indians players
Cleveland Indians players
Dubuque Packers players
Major League Baseball second basemen
People from Menomonie, Wisconsin
Portland Beavers players
Reading Indians players